"All That Matters to Me" is a song written by Franne Golde and Allee Willis and recorded by American recording artist Alexander O'Neal. It is the fourth single from the singer's fifth solo album, Love Makes No Sense (1993). Following the successful chart performances of the Love Makes No Sense single "Love Makes No Sense", "In the Middle", and "Aphrodisia", "All That Matters to Me" was released as the album's fourth single.

The single was recorded at Ocean Way, Village Recorders, House of Soul, Capitol Studios, and Westlake Audio.

Release
The song was O'Neal's 26th hit single and it reached #67 in the UK Singles Chart. "All That Matters to Me" also reached No. 51 in Germany.

Track listing
 12" Single (587 723-1)
"All That Matters To Me (Dan's 12" Club Mix Introducing Chani Chan)" - 7:07
"All That Matters To Me (Serious Rope Dub)" - 7:19
"Aphrodisia (Morie Palma Mix)" - 6:06
"If You Were Here Tonight (Live)" - 3:57

 12" Single Promo (AMYDJ7723)
"All That Matters To Me (Dan's 12" Club Mix Introducing Chani Chan)"
"All That Matters To Me (12" Daytime Mix)"
"All That Matters To Me (Serious Rope Dub)"
"All That Matters To Me (12" Nightime Mix)"

 7" Single (587 714-7)
"All That Matters To Me (Radio Mix)" - 3:42
"Aphrodisia (Morie Palma Edit)" - 3:33

 CD Single (587 723-2)
"All That Matters To Me (Radio Mix)" - 3:53
"All That Matters To Me (Dan's 12" Club Mix Introducing Chani Chan)" - 7:10
"Aphrodisia (Morie Palma Mix)" - 6:05
"If You Were Here Tonight (Live)" - 3:57

 CD Single (587 713-2)
"All That Matters To Me (Edit)" - 3:59
"Aphrodisia" - 5:18
"Come Correct" - 6:23

Personnel
Credits are adapted from the album's liner notes.

 Alexander O'Neal - lead vocals
 Paul Jackson, Jr. - guitar
 Dean Parks - acoustic guitar
 Charles Fearing - clean up woman guitar
 Ed Greene - drums
 Bob Glaub - bass guitar
 John Barnes - piano
 Steve Lindsey - organ, synthesizer 
 David Paich - organ
 Khris Kellow - wurlitzer
 Lenny Castro - percussion
 Jaydee Mannes - pedal steel
 Tony (T.A.) Warren - backing vocals
 Alex Brown - backing vocals
 Jackie Gouche - backing vocals

Sales chart performance

Peak positions

References

External links
 

1993 singles
Alexander O'Neal songs
1993 songs
Songs written by Franne Golde
Songs written by Allee Willis
Tabu Records singles